Alan, Allan, Allen or Alun Armstrong may refer to:

Sports
Alun Armstrong (footballer) (born 1975), English footballer
Alan Armstrong (hurler)
Allan Armstrong (cricketer) on List of Rhodesian representative cricketers

Fictional characters
Alan Armstrong (Spy Smasher)
Senator Alan Armstrong on List of Stargate Universe characters
Principal Allan Armstrong, character in Light It Up (film)

Others
Alan Armstrong (born 1939), American writer
Alun Armstrong (born 1946), English actor